Platycnemis is a genus of damselfly in the family Platycnemididae.

The name comes from the Greek words platos (πλατυς) 'flat' and cnemis (κνημη) 'shin'. They are commonly known as Featherlegs.

The genus contains the following species:

References

Platycnemididae
Zygoptera genera
Taxa named by Hermann Burmeister
Taxonomy articles created by Polbot